The men's javelin throw at the 2011 IPC Athletics World Championships was held at the QEII Stadium from 22–29 January

Medalists

F11
The Men's javelin throw, F11 was held on January 27

F11 =  visual impairment may range from no light perception in either eye, to light perception with inability to recognise the shape of a hand.

Results

Final

Key:   SB = Season Best

F13
The Men's javelin throw, F13 was held on January 29

Classification F13 - visual impairment
F12: may recognise the shape of a hand, a visual acuity of 2/60 and/or visual field of less than 5 degrees. 
F13: visual acuity ranges from 2/60 to 6/60, and/or visual field of more than 5 degrees and less than 20 degrees.

Results

Final

Key:   WR = World Record, CR = Championship Record, AR = Area Record, SB = Season Best, DNF = Did not Finish

F33/34
The Men's javelin throw, F33/34 was held on January 27

Classification F33/34 
F33: some degree of trunk movement when pushing a wheelchair, forward trunk movement limited during forceful pushing. Throwing movements mainly from the arm. Compete in a wheelchair or from a throwing frame. 
F34: good functional strength, minimal limitation or control problems in the arms or trunk. Compete in a wheelchair or from a throwing frame.

Results

Final

Key:   WR = World Record, AR = Area Record, SB = Season Best, NM = No Mark

F35/36
The Men's javelin throw, F35/36 was held on January 22

Classification F35/36 
F35: good static balance, problems in dynamic balance, may need assistive devices for walking but not when standing or throwing, may have sufficient lower extremity function to execute a run up when throwing. 
F36: able to walk without assistance or assistive devices, more control problems with their upper than lower limbs, better leg function than class F35 athletes. Hand control, grasp and release are affected when throwing.

Results

Final

Key:   CR = Championship Record

F37/38
The Men's javelin throw, F37/38 was held on January 26

Classification F37/38 
F37: spasticity in an arm and leg on the same side, good functional ability on the other side, good arm and hand control and follow through. 
F38: must meet the minimum disability criteria for athletes with cerebral palsy, head injury or stroke, a limitation in function that impacts on sports performance.

Results

Final

Key:   CR = Championship Record, SB = Season Best

F40
The Men's javelin throw, F40 was held on January 28

F40 =  dwarfism.

Results

Final

Key:   CR = Championship Record, SB = Season Best

F42
The Men's javelin throw, F42 was held on January 23

F42 =  single above knee amputation, or equivalent impairment.

Results

Final

Key:   SB = Season Best

F44
The Men's javelin throw, F44 was held on January 23

F44 = single below knee amputation or equivalent impairment.

Results

Final

Key:   WR = World Record, SB = Season Best

F46
The Men's javelin throw, F46 was held on January 22 with the medal ceremony on January 23

F46 =  single above or below elbow amputation, or equivalent impairment.

Results

Final

Key:   CR = Championship Record, AR = Asian Record

F52/53
The Men's javelin throw, F52/53 was held on January 29

Classification F52/53 
F52: good shoulder, elbow and wrist function, poor to normal finger flexion and extension, no trunk or leg function. 
F53: normal upper limb function, no abdominal, leg or lower spinal function.

Results

Final

Key:   CR = Championship Record, AR = Area Record, SB = Season Best

F54/55/56
The Men's javelin throw, F54/55/56 was held on January 24

Classification F54/55/56 
F54: normal upper limb function, no abdominal or lower spinal function. 
F55: normal upper limb function, may have partial to ca. normal trunk function, no leg function. 
F56: normal upper limb and trunk function, some leg function, may have high bilateral above knee amputation.

Results

Final

Key:   WR = World Record

F57/58
The Men's javelin throw, F57/58 was held on January 28

Classification F57/58 
F57: normal upper limb and trunk function, may have bilateral above knee amputations. 
F58: normal upper limb and trunk function, a bilateral below knee amputation or single above knee amputation.

Results

Final

Key:   CR = Championship Record

See also
2011 IPC Athletics World Championships – Men's pentathlon
List of IPC world records in athletics

References
General
Schedule and results, Official site of the 2011 IPC Athletics World Championships
IPC Athletics Classification Explained, Scottish Disability Sport
Specific

Javelin throw
Javelin throw at the World Para Athletics Championships